Seaside High School is a public high school in Seaside, Oregon, United States. A new combined Middle and High School was constructed high up on a ridge as a precaution, since the old High School was in a Tsunami Danger Zone. The old school site is For Sale.

Academics
In 2008, 75% of the school's seniors received their high school diploma. Of 122 students, 92 graduated, 21 dropped out, 1 received a modified diploma, and 8 are still in high school.

Athletics
Fall Sports
Football
Boys and Girls Soccer
Volleyball
Cross Country
Winter Sports
Boys and Girls Basketball
Boys and Girls Swimming
Wrestling

Spring Sports
Baseball
Softball
Boys and Girls Golf
Track and Field

Clubs
National Honor Society, Key Club, Cheer Club, GSA, FRC Robotics,

Notable alumni
Ben Archibald, CFL player for the Calgary Stampeders
 Karl Marlantes, author, Rhodes Scholar

References

High schools in Clatsop County, Oregon
Public high schools in Oregon
Seaside, Oregon